The 1978–79 season was Manchester United's 77th season in the Football League, and their fourth consecutive season in the top division of English football. They finished the season ninth in the league, but were more successful in the FA Cup, reaching the final where they lost 3-2 to Arsenal at Wembley, conceding a late goal from Alan Sunderland in the final minute of the game after coming from 2-0 down make it 2-2 in the closing minutes of the game.

First Division

FA Cup

League Cup

Squad statistics

References

Manchester United F.C. seasons
Manchester United